Jo Enright is an English stand-up comedian and actress who has appeared in a number of television and radio comedy programmes. She is best known for her roles in The Job Lot, Life's Too Short and Trollied.

Career
In 1995, she made her Edinburgh Festival debut as part of the three-hander The West Midland's Serious Comedy Squad. In 2002, she appeared alongside Steve Coogan in episode five, series two of the BBC comedy I'm Alan Partridge as a tax inspector investigating Alan. In 2005, she appeared in the BBC Radio 4 series The Ape that Got Lucky with Chris Addison. In 2006, she appeared in the comedy series Time Trumpet on BBC Two, playing herself as a commentator in the year 2031 looking back on the world nearly thirty years before. From July 2008, she appeared in the BBC comedy series Lab Rats as Cara McIlvenny.

In 2008, Enright played wheelchair user Jackie, a member of the fictional "2 Up, 2 Down", on Peter Kay's Britain's Got the Pop Factor... and Possibly a New Celebrity Jesus Christ Soapstar Superstar Strictly on Ice, a spoof on the talent show genre of programmes. In 2009 she began playing "Carol" in the fifth and sixth series of the BBC Three sitcom Ideal. In 2011, Enright appeared in Ricky Gervais's and Stephen Merchant's television comedy series Life's Too Short as Sue, Warwick Davis's estranged wife. In 2012, she appeared as baker Sharon in the Sky1 sitcom Trollied. From April 2013 until November 2015, Enright appeared as officious job centre worker Angela Bromford in the ITV2 comedy series The Job Lot. In 2022, Enright appeared in a guest role as Vera, the swinger, in series 3 of Ricky Gervais' After Life.

Awards
2002: Chortle Award winner for best female circuit comic
2001: Best Female on the Jongleurs Comedy Circuit, sponsored by Bodyform
1996: Named comedian of the year at the Leicester Comedy Festival

Filmography
After Life as Vera; Series 3 episode 2; uncredited
Porters (2017, 2019) as Janice Grimm
Nurse (2015) as Bernie
The Job Lot (2013–2015) as Angela Bromford
Trollied (2012) as Sharon the Baker
Life's Too Short (2011–2013) as Sue
Ideal (2009–2011) as Carol
Lab Rats (2008) as Cara McIlvenny
Britain's Got the Pop Factor... and Possibly a New Celebrity Jesus Christ Soapstar Superstar Strictly on Ice (2008) as Jackie from contestants "2 Up 2 Down"
Time Trumpet (2006) as herself (in an imagined future)
Brain Candy (BBC) - (2003) as herselfRound (2003) as AnnI'm Alan Partridge - I Know What Alan Did Last Summer (2002) as Tax Inspector CatherineWorld of Pub - Ladies (2001)Phoenix Nights (aka Peter Kay's Phoenix Nights) - Episode #1.4 (2001) as Beverly HillscoptuThat Peter Kay Thing - The Arena (1999)I Love a 1970's Christmas (2000) as herselfBarking'' (1998), Channel 4 sketch show, as writer and performer

She has also provided voice-overs in advertisements for Jaffa Cakes, Living TV, Sainsburys and Nescafe.

References

External links
Profile at Chortle
Comedy CV profile

English comedy writers
English television actresses
English women comedians
Living people
Alumni of Middlesex University
People from Birmingham, West Midlands
Comedians from Birmingham, West Midlands
Year of birth missing (living people)
20th-century English comedians
21st-century English comedians
20th-century English women
20th-century English people
21st-century English women